Dunderdalsbreen is a glacier in Wedel Jarlsberg Land at Spitsbergen, Svalbard. It has a length of about four kilometers, and is located between Konglomeratfjellet and Lifjellet.

References

Glaciers of Spitsbergen